The eight series of Let's Dance  started on 13 March 2015. Sylvie Meis and Daniel Hartwich returned as hosts while Motsi Mabuse, Joachim Llambi and Jorge Gonzalez also returned as the judges.

For the first time 14 couples  danced on the show.

Couples

Scoring chart

Red numbers indicates the lowest score for each week.
Green numbers indicates the highest score for each week.
 indicates the couple eliminated that week.
 indicates the returning couple that finished in the bottom two.
 indicates the couple that withdrew from the competition.
 indicates the couple was eliminated but later returned to the competition.
 indicates the winning couple.
 indicates the runner-up couple.
 indicates the third-place couple.

Averages 
This table only counts for dances scored on a traditional 30-points scale.

Highest and lowest scoring performances 
The best and worst performances in each dance according to the judges' marks are as follows:

Couples' Highest and lowest scoring performances
According to the traditional 30-point scale.

Weekly scores and songs

Week 1: Opening Night 

Running order

Week 2

Running order

Week 3: 80's Night 
 The couples performed to a song from the 1980s

Running order

Week 4

Running order

Week 5: Musical Night 
 The couples performed to a song from a musical.

Running order

Week 6

Running order

Week 7: Idols Night 
 The couples performed to a song from her idol.

Running order

Week 8
 On May 4, 2015, Ralf Bauer had to withdraw from the competition because of health issues. Katja Burkard returned to the competition.
Running order

Week 9: Dance Duels Night 
 For the first time a "Dance Duel" was introduced to the show. Two couples had to perform at the same time a dance style with the same choreography. The Rock n' Roll was also introduced as a new dance style.

Running order

Week 10

Running order

Week 11: Semi-Final
 For the first time every semi-finalist had to learn three individual dances while the third dance was an "impro dance" which means that the celebrities got the music only 20 minutes before they had to perform. They did not know the dance style and their costumes too.

Running order

Week 12: Finale

Running order

Encore performances by the eliminated couples

Dance chart
 Highest scoring dance
 Lowest scoring dance
 Did not scored (encore performance in the finale)
 Withdrew from the competition

References

Let's Dance (German TV series)
2015 German television seasons